Brzeście may refer to the following places in Poland:
Brzeście, Lower Silesian Voivodeship (south-west Poland)
Brzeście, Jędrzejów County in Świętokrzyskie Voivodeship (south-central Poland)
Brzeście, Pińczów County in Świętokrzyskie Voivodeship (south-central Poland)
Brzeście, Skarżysko County in Świętokrzyskie Voivodeship (south-central Poland)
Brzeście, Gmina Kluczewsko in Świętokrzyskie Voivodeship (south-central Poland)
Brzeście, Gmina Radków in Świętokrzyskie Voivodeship (south-central Poland)
Brzeście, Masovian Voivodeship (east-central Poland)
Brzeście, West Pomeranian Voivodeship (north-west Poland)